Dominic Collins (born 11 April 1977)  is an Australian Paralympic swimmer.  He was born in Sydney, New South Wales.  At the 1996 Atlanta Games, he won a silver medal in the Men's 4x100 m Freestyle S7–10 event. He participated without winning any medals at the 2000 Sydney Games.

References

Male Paralympic swimmers of Australia
Swimmers at the 1996 Summer Paralympics
Swimmers at the 2000 Summer Paralympics
Paralympic silver medalists for Australia
Living people
Medalists at the 1996 Summer Paralympics
1977 births
Paralympic medalists in swimming
Australian male freestyle swimmers
S8-classified Paralympic swimmers